Claire Coelho (born 16 May 1996) is an Australian soccer player, who currently plays for Newcastle Jets in the Australian W-League.

Club career

Newcastle Jets, 2014–
Coelho played for the Newcastle Jets from 2014 to 2017. During a match against the Brisbane Roar on 26 October 2014, she made 11 saves (9 in the second half) after replacing the starting goalkeeper due to injury. The Jets finished the 2014–15 W-League season in fifth place with a  record.

In September 2015, she re-signed with the team for the 2015–16 W-League season, though did not play.

During the 2016–17 W-League season, Coehlo made one appearance for the Jets before transferring to Sydney FC. In November 2016, after coming on for Kelsey Wys due to injury, Coehlo was named player of the match for her shutout in the 1–0 win over Perth Glory.

Sydney FC, 2017
In February 2017, Coelho joined Sydney FC as an injury replacement for Sham Khamis. After advancing to the play-offs, the team was defeated 5–1 during the semi-finals.

References

Living people
Australian women's soccer players
Newcastle Jets FC (A-League Women) players
Sydney FC (A-League Women) players
A-League Women players
Women's association football goalkeepers
1996 births
People from the Mid North Coast
Sportswomen from New South Wales
Soccer players from New South Wales